The 1968–69 Liga Bet season saw Beitar Kiryat Tiv'on,  Hapoel Tirat HaCarmel, Hapoel Bat Yam and Hapoel Eilat win their regional divisions and promoted to Liga Alef.

North Division A

North Division B

Hapoel Shefayim folded during the season.

South Division A

South Division B

References
Four promoted teams determined Maariv, 25.5.69, Historical Jewish Press 
Fourth relegated team to Liga Gimel will be determined next Saturday Davar, 26.5.69, Historical Jewish Press 
First matchday in Bet Leagues passed in peace Davar, 30.9.68, Historical Jewish Press 
Before last matchday Maariv, 18.5.69, Historical Jewish Press 

Liga Bet seasons
Israel
3